The International Association for Relational Psychoanalysis and Psychotherapy (IARPP) is an organization that was founded in 2001 to promote the development of relational psychoanalysis.  

The association is a professional and intellectual community of clinicians and non-clinicians (such as academics) who are committed to developing relational perspectives and exploring similarities and differences with other approaches to psychoanalysis and psychotherapy.

References 
The International Association for Relational Psychoanalysis and Psychotherapy Web site

Relational psychoanalysis